The 2009 Kontinental Hockey League All-Star Game was the All-Star game for the inaugural 2008–09 Kontinental Hockey League (KHL) season. It took place on January 10, 2009, at Red Square in Moscow, Russia. The World team won 7–6 over the Russian team.

Nominations
Each team consisted of 9 forwards, 6 defensemen, and 2 goaltenders. The starting rosters were voted upon on the KHL.ru website. Both team captains were entitled to opt in 2 alternate captains of their choosing. The secondary lines and goaltenders were voted upon by the media and announced December 26, 2008, with the remaining players and reserves announced by January 8.

Events

Game

The format for the game was "Team Yashin" (Russia) vs. "Team Jágr" (World). The teams were named after players who are highly recognized in the sport and synonymous with their respective countries. Both players also captained their teams for the event. The format was voted on by the fans, with the alternative being the standard interconference matchup. This is reminiscent of the format introduced for the 48th NHL All-Star Game and will be used as a device to promote the game outside of Russia, as well as to promote the diversity of the league itself.

Skills Competition
The Fastest Skater
Shootout Skill
Long Range Shot
Zigzag Team Relay
Goalie Competition
Accurate Shooting
Speed Relay

Rosters

*International player's flags indicate nation of origin whereas Russian born player's flags indicate the Federal subject of origin

See also
2008–09 KHL season
Kontinental Hockey League All-Star Game

References

External links
 khlallstars.ru - Official homepage

2009
All Star Game
Sports competitions in Moscow
Red Square
2009 in Moscow
Outdoor ice hockey games
January 2009 sports events in Europe